The 1999 Victorian state election, held on Saturday, 18 September 1999, was for the 54th Parliament of Victoria. It was held in the Australian state of Victoria to elect the 88 members of the state's Legislative Assembly and 22 members of the 44-member Legislative Council. The Liberal–National Coalition led by Jeff Kennett and Pat McNamara, which had held majority government since the 1996 election, lost 15 seats and its majority due mainly to a swing against it in rural and regional Victoria.

The Labor Party, led by Steve Bracks, although also not having majority of the seats, took government due to support from three rural independents. They decided to back the Labor Party, which gave a working majority in the chamber to a Labor minority government. Bracks was sworn in as Premier of Victoria on 20 October 1999.

Results

Legislative Assembly

|}

Legislative Council

The following voting statistics exclude the three mid-term by-elections held on the same day, at which two seats were retained by Labor and a third was gained by Labor from the Liberals.

|}

Maps

Seats changing hands

Members listed in italics did not recontest their seats.
The Liberal-turned-Independent member for Frankston East, Peter McLellan died on election day. A supplementary election was held in which Labor won.
In addition, Labor won Mitcham in a by-election and retained it in this election.
In addition, Independent Susan Davies won Gippsland West in a by-election and retained it in this election.

Campaign
The Kennett government entered the campaign with a substantial lead in the polls and was widely expected to win, some commentators even tipped the government to increase their already large majority.

The Liberals ran a campaign centred on Jeff Kennett and the unusual jeff.com.au website. The presidential nature of the campaign was emphasised when the Herald Sun ran a damaging front-page story revealing that most Liberal candidates were gagged from speaking to the media. The Coalition stuck to a message of focusing on its economic record, and promising modest increases in spending in schools, hospitals and police.

In contrast Labor sought to tap into perceptions in rural Victoria that the Kennett government had neglected them. Both John Brumby who led Labor until early 1999 and Steve Bracks campaigned extensively in rural and regional Victoria, attacking Coalition policies of privatisation highlighting poor service delivery. Labor also took the unusual step of launching their campaign in the regional centre of Ballarat where it announced it would spend $170 million to improve rural infrastructure. In addition Labor campaigned on issues of government transparency and service administration.
By election day few people believed that there would be a change of government. When The Australian published a poll which suggested the result would be a cliffhanger, Steve Bracks is said to have stated 'I hope it's right, but I think The Australian is on drugs.'
Kennett during the campaign was at the centre of controversy over a heated interview with ABC Radio presenter Jon Faine.https://www.abc.net.au/news/2019-10-11/jeff-kennetts-tense-interview-on-abc/11417696

Election day
On the afternoon of the election, while polling was being conducted, it was learned that Liberal-turned-Independent member for the marginal seat of Frankston East, Peter McLellan, had died of a heart attack. Polling was therefore aborted, with a supplementary election to be scheduled.

When the results started to come through, it appeared that there was only a modest swing in metropolitan Melbourne, even in the electorally volatile eastern suburbs, but there was a substantial swing to Labor in provincial and rural Victoria, traditionally a Liberal stronghold. Political analyst and ABC commentator Antony Green later wrote that "in the more than 35 elections I've been involved in, the 1999 Victorian election was the only one where I thought there was something wrong with the computer."

When the Victorian Electoral Commission finished counting for the night, the result was still too close to call: Labor had made huge gains in the rural hinterland, but had failed to make much headway in the eastern suburbs of Melbourne where elections had historically been won or lost.

Frankston East and rural independents
Initial counting had the Coalition on 43 seats in the 88-seat chamber, Labor on 41 (including winning the seat of Geelong by just 16 votes), and the independents on three. Frankston East remained vacant pending the results of the 16 October supplementary election. As McLellan died on the day of the general election, voters in Frankston East had already cast votes before learning of McLellan's death. As McLellan died while the campaign was underway, the Victorian constitution required a supplementary election in the seat.

Regardless of who won in Frankston East, neither the Coalition nor Labor could form a government without the support of the independents, leaving them in a position to effectively choose the next premier.

The independents, Russell Savage, Craig Ingram and Susan Davies, adopted a united stand and released a charter of their demands which the parties would need to accept to further negotiate. Labor accepted all of them while the Coalition accepted all but two, saying that the Upper House should only be reformed after a referendum and rejecting outright an enquiry into the effects of privatisation. The independents announced that they would announce their decision after the supplementary election in Frankston East, which was to be held on 16 October and now assumed a crucial role.

On 16 October, the Frankston East supplementary by-election resulted in a 7.71% swing to Labor, with its candidate Matt Viney winning 54.60% of the two-party preferred vote, putting Labor on 42 seats. The votes that were cast in Frankston East on the day of the election and McLellan's death had been destroyed without being counted. It is therefore unknown whether Frankston East voters had voted differently in the supplementary election than the way they voted at the general election.

The next morning, Labor and the Independents signed an agreement which became public the following day. Although this allowed Labor to form government by one seat, Kennett's supporters urged the Coalition to force a last-ditch confidence vote on the floor of the Assembly. They believed that Savage, Davies and Ingram would be forced to publicly support Kennett. In truth, Savage and Davies felt that Kennett had given them short shrift during the previous term, and would not have even considered supporting any government led by Kennett. However, with the Liberals divided on Kennett's future role, Kennett resigned as premier and retired from politics.

Aftermath
Kennett's resignation became official on 20 October. Soon afterward, Bracks advised the Governor, Sir James Gobbo, that he could form a government, which was duly sworn in later that day. With Kennett retiring from politics, Dr Denis Napthine, a rural MP who was believed to bring a more consensus-style approach to leadership, succeeded him as Liberal leader.  Nationals leader Pat McNamara retired from politics as well.  His successor, Peter Ryan, tore up the Coalition agreement; the Liberals and Nationals would not resume their Coalition until 2008.

Labor won Kennett's old seat of Burwood in a by-election that December after he decided to retire from parliament. The following year they also won McNamara's hitherto safe seat of Benalla in another by-election, which brought them to 44 of the Assembly's 88 seats.

See also

 Members of the Victorian Legislative Assembly, 1999–2002
 Members of the Victorian Legislative Council, 1999–2002
 Candidates of the 1999 Victorian state election

References

Elections in Victoria (Australia)
1999 elections in Australia
1990s in Victoria (Australia)
September 1999 events in Australia